Orochen 1-y is a rural locality (a selo), one of four settlements, in addition to the Urban-type settlements of Leninsky, the administrative centre of the settlement, and Lebediny, and the village of Yakokut in the Leninsky Urban Settlement of Aldansky District in the Sakha Republic, Russia. Its population as of the 2002 Census was 42.

References

Notes

Sources
Official website of the Sakha Republic. Registry of the Administrative-Territorial Divisions of the Sakha Republic. Aldansky District. 

Rural localities in Aldansky District